Tai Tam (Quarry Bay Extension) Country Park (Chinese: 大潭（鰂魚涌擴建部份）郊野公園), also known simply as Quarry Bay Country Park (鰂魚涌郊野公園), on the eastern side of Hong Kong Island, is one of the twenty four statutory country parks in Hong Kong, and the twentieth to be so designated, in 1979. This  park is located near Quarry Bay. It covers Mount Parker, the second highest peak on Hong Kong Island, as well as Mount Butler and Siu Ma Shan. Sir Cecil's Ride goes through the park.

A major feature of this country park is a site with dozens of wartime field stove, built in preparation for the Second World War. , a red-brick house which currently houses a biodiversity education centre and was a residence for the Taikoo Sugar Refinery, is also located within this country park at 50 Mount Parker Road. Hong Park Country Trail, Quarry Bay Tree Walk and Quarry Bay Jogging Trail are located within the park. According to a Strategic Environmental Assessment (SEA) of the Environmental Protection Department the number of visitors in 1998-1999 was 701,400, second only to Aberdeen Country Park amongst country parks on Hong Kong Island.

See also
  (between Mount Parker and Mount Butler)
 Hong Kong Trail
 Wilson Trail
 Mount Parker Cable Car

References

1979 establishments in Hong Kong
Country parks and special areas of Hong Kong
Quarry Bay